Woldgate School (formerly College) is a coeducational secondary school and sixth form on Kilnwick Road in Pocklington, East Riding of Yorkshire, England. It educates approximately 1,169 pupils aged 11 to 18.  Until 2017, the school was Local Authority funded, but became an Academy in January 2017 and is now part of a Multi-Learning Partnership.  It was rated 'good in its last Ofsted inspection.

Woldgate School was built in the 1950s and educates pupils from Pocklington and its surrounding villages, which forms a large, mainly rural catchment area.

The school was awarded specialist status and received a grant for developing performing arts. A new music block was built, which included a recording studio, practice rooms and a dance studio.

The school teaching is under the National Curriculum, and includes a Sixth Form.

Facilities include a dedicated Sixth Form study room and more than 800 computers, with a library and an Independent Learning Centre used for homework assistance and computer access. Other facilities are a gymnasium, a multi-use hall, fitness suite, tennis/netball courts, and a playing field used for football, rugby and athletics.

Notable former pupils 

 Robert E Fuller, wildlife artist
 Findlay Brown, musician
 Michael Woods, football player
 Nick Culkin, football player

References

External links
 School Website
 Ofsted Inspection Reports

Educational institutions established in 1958
Secondary schools in the East Riding of Yorkshire
1958 establishments in England
Academies in the East Riding of Yorkshire
School buildings in the United Kingdom destroyed by arson
Pocklington